is a passenger railway station located in the Niibori neighborhood of  the city of Kumagaya, Saitama Prefecture, Japan, operated by the East Japan Railway Company (JR East).

Lines
Kagohara Station is served by the Takasaki Line, with through Shōnan-Shinjuku Line and Ueno-Tokyo Line services to and from the Tōkaidō Line.

Station layout
The station has two island platform serving four tracks, with an elevated station building located above the platforms. The station has a "Midori no Madoguchi" staffed ticket office.

Platforms

 Platforms 2 and 4 serve as side tracks for terminating trains.

History 
Kagohara Station opened on 16 December 1909. The station became part of the JR East network after the privatization of the JNR on 1 April 1987.

Passenger statistics
In fiscal 2019, the station was used by an average of 14,920 passengers daily (boarding passengers only).

Surrounding area
JASDF Kumagaya Airbase
Kumagaya Industrial Park
Kumagaya-Nishi High School

See also
List of railway stations in Japan

References

External links

JR East Kagohara Station

Railway stations in Saitama Prefecture
Railway stations in Japan opened in 1909
Takasaki Line
Stations of East Japan Railway Company
Railway stations in Kumagaya
Shōnan-Shinjuku Line